¿Quién es quién?, is an American telenovela produced by Gemma Lombardi, Joshua Mintz
and Carmen Cecilia Urbaneja for Telemundo. It is an adaptation of the telenovela produced in 2003, Amor descarado.

Episodes

References 

Lists of American drama television series episodes